Alexander Patrick O'Dowd (born 25 February 1967) is a professional first class rugby coach and former New Zealand first class cricketer.

A right-handed batsman, O'Dowd made 17 appearances in first-class cricket, 14 of them for Auckland between 1991 and the end of 1993 and three more for Northern Districts in 1996–97. O'Dowd scored his only century in his second match; hitting 113 against Canterbury in 1992. He also briefly served as Auckland's captain.

For several seasons from 1991 O'Dowd was a cricket player/coach in the Netherlands for Hoofdklasse club HBS Craeyenhout. O'Dowd's son, Max O'Dowd, also plays cricket, and, by virtue of holding a Dutch passport, made his debut for the Dutch national side in 2015.

See also
 List of Auckland representative cricketers

References

External links

1967 births
Living people
Auckland cricketers
Northern Districts cricketers
New Zealand cricketers
New Zealand people of Irish descent
Cricketers from Auckland
Sportspeople from Auckland
New Zealand rugby union coaches
Netherlands national rugby union team coaches